The 1976 World Championship for Makes was part of the 24th season of FIA World Sportscar Championship motor racing. It was a series for production based cars from the following FIA categories 
 Group 5 Special Production Cars
 Group 4 Special Grand Touring Cars
 Group 3 Series Production Grand Touring Cars
 Group 2 Touring Cars
 Group 1 Series Production Touring Cars
The series ran from 21 March 1976 to 4 September 1976, and comprised 7 races in total.

The championship was won by Porsche.

World Sportscar Championship

Following the 1975 season, the FIA chose to divide the World Championship into two series that would run simultaneously but separately.  Open-cockpit sportscars (formerly known as FIA Group 5 Sports Cars, now officially FIA Group 6 Two-Seater Racing Cars) would transfer from the World Championship for Makes to a new World Championship for Sports Cars, while production-based cars (such as the new Group 5 Special Production Cars) would contest the World Championship for Makes.  Events in which both types of car ran, such as the 24 Hours of Le Mans, were not counted towards either championship.

World Championship for Makes

Schedule

Race results

Championship results
Points were awarded to the top 10 finishers in the order of 20-15-12-10-8-6-4-3-2-1. Manufacturers were only given points for their highest finishing car with any other cars from that manufacturer merely skipped in the points allocation. Only the best 5 points finishes for each make counted towards the championship with any other points earned not included in the totals. Discarded points are shown in the table below within brackets.

In addition to the outright championship the FIA also awarded three Divisional titles. 
Division 1 was for cars with an engine capacity of up to 2000cc, Division 2 for cars from 2001 to 3000cc and Division 3 for those above 3000cc.

Division 1

Division 2

Division 3

References

External links
 World Championship - final positions and tables, www.classicscars.com
 World Championship 1976 (race results), www.classicscars.com
 Photo Gallery of World Championship, www.racingsportscars.com

World Sportscar Championship seasons
World Championship for Makes